Ruijin Hospital is a renowned general hospital in Shanghai, China, with the rating of "Grade 3, Class A", the highest rating in the Chinese medical system. It is a university hospital affiliated to School of Medicine, Shanghai Jiao Tong University.

The hospital was founded in 1907, formerly known as Sainte Marie Hospital in English and Guangci in Chinese. It has a land area of 120,000 sq. meters, among which, buildings cover 245,000 sq. meters and green field, 40,000 sq. meters. The hospital boasts a number of world-recognized medical scientists and experts, including Chen Zhu, Wang Zhenyi and Chen Saijuan.

Ruijin Hospital is the largest clinical teaching center of School of Medicine, Shanghai Jiao Tong University.

External links

Hospitals established in 1907
Teaching hospitals in Shanghai
1907 establishments in China
Shanghai Jiao Tong University
Huangpu District, Shanghai